San Salvatore is a Romanesque-Gothic-style Roman Catholic church located in the town of Sant'Angelo in Pontano, province of Macerata, region of Marche, Italy.

History
The church, in Romanesque-Gothic style, dates back to the first half of the XII century. The interior is divided into three naves, of which the central one has a trussed ceiling, while the lateral ones have a cross. The plan became a Greek cross with the addition of two side chapels in the 1700s. The crypt, like the bell tower, was added in the 14th century and is as large as the church above, with brick arches and cross vaults.

Inside, some fine holy water fonts made from ancient capitals, and on the fourth pillar on the right, a fresco, perhaps to be attributed to the circle of Salimbeni of Sanseverino, depicting the Madonna and Child. It preserves a Crudeli organ of the late eighteenth century recently restored 

Since 1169 we have news of the nearby Rectory, led by an abbot and faithful to the rule of Sant'Agostino. He became prioress and, in 1807, archpriest.

References

12th-century Roman Catholic church buildings in Italy
Romanesque architecture in le Marche
Gothic architecture in le Marche
Sant'Angelo in Pontano
Sant'Angelo in Pontano